Cannon Park may refer to:

Cannon Park, a suburb in Coventry
Cannon Park, Milwaukee, a neighborhood in Milwaukee, Wisconsin
Cannon Park (Charleston, SC), a public park in Charleston, South Carolina